The Junior World Ski Orienteering Championships (or Ski-JWOC) were first held in 1994. Since 1998, competitions have been held annually. Representative countries must be members of the International Orienteering Federation (IOF).

Host Towns/Cities

Classic/Long
This event was called "Classic distance" from 1994 to 1999. Since 2000 it is called "Long distance".

Men

Women

Short/Middle
This event was called "Short distance" from 1994 to 2004. Since 2005 it is called "Middle distance".

Men

Women

Sprint
This event was first held in 2005.

Men

Women

Relay

Men

Women

See also
World Ski Orienteering Championships
World Cup in Ski Orienteering

References

Notes

External links and references
Ski-JWOC (IOF) (Retrieved October 27, 2020)
Ski-JWOC2006 – Official site  (Retrieved June 29, 2008)
Ski-JWOC2007 – Official site  (Retrieved June 29, 2008)
Ski-JWOC2008 – Official site  (Retrieved June 29, 2008)
  
Ski-JWOC2010 – Official site  

Ski, Junior
Recurring sporting events established in 1994
Orienteering, Junior
Ski-orienteering competitions